The Sri Lanka men's national 3x3 team is a national basketball team of Sri Lanka, administered by the Sri Lanka Basketball Federation.

It represents the country in international 3x3 (3 against 3) basketball competitions.

Performance at Asian Games

See also
Sri Lanka women's national 3x3 team
Sri Lanka men's national basketball team

References

3x3
Men's national 3x3 basketball teams